Dawnn Karen is an American fashion psychologist, professor of psychology, author and model.

Life

Early life 
Karen was born in Cleveland, Ohio. She is of African-American and Jamaican heritage. In secondary school she skipped the 5th grade and soon after began attending the Cleveland School of the Arts in high school where she majored in vocal music (opera) and minored in creative writing.  She attended Bowling Green State University majoring in Psychology and minoring in Ethnic studies.

For graduate studies, she attended Teachers College, Columbia University, graduating with a Masters of Arts in counseling psychology.

Personal life 
Karen resides in New York City.

Career

Fashion psychologist 
Karen claims to be the world's first fashion psychologist, and has trademarked the term "Fashion Psychology Field" but as noted by the New York Times, Jaehee Jung from the University of Delaware has taught a course combining the fields of fashion and psychology since 2008.

In the beginning of her career, she traveled the Middle East, Asia and parts of Europe gathering qualitative research by working with various clients creating her fashion psychology field theories. She has worked with clients such as Klarna, A$AP Rocky, PayPal, and Honey. 

She has spoken at the Kyiv Security Forum on the burkini ban, and at the United Nations on empowering women via fashion psychology. 

She acquired her title as "doctor" when the New York Times dubbed her as "The Dress Doctor". The Times declared her as "the world’s first fashion psychologist".

Professor 
Karen became the youngest and first black female psychology professor at the Fashion Institute of Technology in April 2015. There she taught courses such as Color psychology and General Psychology in the Social sciences Department.

Model 
Dawnn Karen worked as a former model signed to MMG Agency while attending Teachers College Columbia University. She also worked as a former PR girl and an accessories designer.

Publications 
Her book Dress Your Best Life; how to harness the power of clothes to transform your confidence was published in the UK on March 26, 2020. It was also published in the US under Dress Your Best Life; how to use fashion psychology to take your look and your life to the next level on April 14, 2020.

References

External links 
Official website

American fashion businesspeople
Living people
Year of birth missing (living people)